Ammanford railway station was opened under the name Cross Inn by the Llanelly Railway in 1840 to serve the town of Ammanford, West Wales. It was renamed Ammanford in 1883. The station was the main one in the town until it closed in 1958, leaving the current Ammanford station (then known as Tirydail, later Ammanford & Tirydail) providing trains for the area.

History
Opened by the Llanelly Railway, then by the Great Western Railway, staying with that company during the Grouping of 1923. The station then passed on to the Western Region of British Railways on nationalisation in 1948.

The station was then closed by the British Transport Commission.

See also
Ammanford Colliery Halt railway station
Ammanford railway station

References
 
 
 Station on navigable O.S. map. Station nearest coach station marked Bettws.

External links 

Disused railway stations in Carmarthenshire
Former Great Western Railway stations
Railway stations in Great Britain opened in 1840
Railway stations in Great Britain closed in 1958
1840 establishments in Wales
1958 disestablishments in Wales